Rocciamelone (or Roche Melon) is a 3,538 m high mountain in Piedmont, Italy, near the border between Italy and France.

Geography 

Rocciamelone is located between Val di Susa and Maurienne, 50 km west of Turin.

Its summit is the tripoint where the comunes of Usseglio, Novalesa and Mompantero meet. The international border crosses the Glacier de Rochemelon 1 kilometer north of the summit, making it appear that the border is not following the watershed precisely in this sector. However, the glacier is draped over a ridge that is the true watershed and is precisely followed by the borderline.

SOIUSA classification 

According to the SOIUSA (International Standardized Mountain Subdivision of the Alps) the mountain can be classified in the following way:
 main part = Western Alps
 major sector = North Western Alps
 section = Graian Alps
 subsection = Southern Graian Alps
 supergroup = catena Rocciamelone-Charbonnel
 group = gruppo del Rocciamelone
 subgroup = nodo del Rocciamelone
 code = I/B-7.I-A.2.a

History 
The teutonic knight Bonifacius Rotarius (of Asti) made the first ascent of Rocciamelone on 1 September 1358, to bring a small metal image of the Holy Virgin as a gesture of gratitude for having survived captivity in the Holy Land during a war against the Muslims.

The summit of Rocciamelone is the destination of a traditional pilgrimage, every year, on August 5. A three-metre-high statue of the Blessed Virgin Mary was erected there in 1899.

Access to the summit 
Because of its easy access (the start of the summit trail can be reached in a 90-minute drive from Turin), its considerable height and the  panorama, this mountain is one of the most frequented of the western part of the Alps.

Mountain huts 
 Rifugio Cà d'Asti (2,854 m - Mompantero)
 Rifugio Ernesto Tazzetti (2,642 - Usseglio)
 Rifugio Santa Maria (close to the summit)

Notes

Maps
 Istituto Geografico Militare (IGM) official maps of Italy, 1:25.000 and 1:100.000 scale, on-line version
 Istituto Geografico Centrale (IGC) - Carta dei sentieri e dei rifugi scala 1:50.000 n. 2 Valli di Lanzo e Moncenisio
 Istituto Geografico Centrale - Carta dei sentieri e dei rifugi scala 1:25.000 n.110 Alte Valli di Lanzo (Rocciamelone - Uja di Ciamarella - Le Levanne)

External links

 Rocciamelone
 Rocciamelone at SummitPost

Mountains of Piedmont
Mountains of the Graian Alps
Alpine three-thousanders
Three-thousanders of Italy
Metropolitan City of Turin